John Warner (1927–2021) was an American politician: Secretary of the Navy from 1972 to 1974, Republican senator from Virginia from 1979 to 2009.

John Warner may also refer to:

People
John Warner (bishop) (1581–1666), Bishop of Rochester
John Warner (chemist) (born 1962), American chemist and co-founder of the Warner Babcock Institute for Green Chemistry
John Warner (college president) (1897–1989), American college president
John Warner (comics) (born 1952), American comic book writer and editor
Jack Warner (footballer, born 1883) (John Warner), English professional footballer with Portsmouth
John Warner (footballer, born 1961), English footballer with Colchester
John Warner (judge) (born 1943), American judge and attorney, and a justice of the Montana Supreme Court since 2003
John Warner (writer) (born 1970), American humorist, author, and editor of McSweeney's Internet Tendency
John Warner (Australian politician) (1923–1991), member of the Queensland Legislative Assembly
John Warner (North Dakota politician) (born 1952), Democratic-NPL politician
John De Witt Warner (1851–1925), American politician, Congressman from New York 1891–1895
John Warner (RAF officer) (1899–1918), World War I flying ace
John Warner (physician) (died 1565), British academic and cleric, Regius Professor of Medicine
John Warner (Lord Mayor) (died 1648), English merchant who was Lord Mayor of London in 1647
J. Foster Warner (1859–1937), architect in Rochester, New York
John Warner (Jesuit) (1628–1692), English Jesuit, known as a controversialist and confessor to James II
USS John Warner (SSN-785), a Virginia-class submarine of the United States Navy launched in 2014
John Warner (actor) (1924–2001), British actor
John Warner (umpire) (1911–1995), South African cricket umpire
John Warner (scholar) (1736–1800), English cleric and classical scholar
John Warner (MP), Member of Parliament (MP) for Bishop's Lynn
John Warner (racing driver), in 2001 12 Hours of Sebring

Other
The John Warner School, a school located in Hoddesdon, England
John Warner & Sons, a UK metalworks

See also
John Warner Barber (1798–1885), American engraver and artist
Jack Warner (disambiguation)
Jackie Warner (disambiguation)
Juan José Warner (1807–1890), California rancher
Warner (disambiguation)